Kakhk is a city in Razavi Khorasan Province, Iran.

Kakhk may also refer to:
 Kakhk, South Khorasan
 Kakhk, alternate name of Kakhkuk, South Khorasan Province
 Kakhk District, in Razavi Khorasan Province
 Kakhk Rural District, in Razavi Khorasan Province